Giustolisi is an Italian surname. Notable people with the surname include:

 Alberto Mario Giustolisi (1928–1990), Italian chess player
 Luca Giustolisi (born 1970), Italian former water polo player

Italian-language surnames